John Francis Peggotty (1864 – 1899) was an Irish bushranger in Australia also known as the "Birdman of the Coorong". He reputedly rode an ostrich and wore large amounts of gold jewellery while committing his crimes, though some claim that the story is a fabrication.

Early life
John Francis Peggotty, sometimes known as Liam Peggotty, was born in County Limerick 1864. It is reported that he was born 3 months prematurely, and never grew larger than the size of the 7-year-old child.

As a young man, Peggotty travelled to South Africa, where he learnt how to ride ostriches. He then travelled to England where he reputedly began breaking into houses by climbing down the chimney. It was also in England that he began wearing a large amount of gold jewellery. He served a 5-year prison sentence in England, after which he emigrated to Australia.

Life in Australia
Arriving in Australia, Peggotty was supposed to work on his uncle's farm in Orange, New South Wales, but instead resumed his criminal activity in Adelaide of burglary through chimneys. He is also alleged to have recruited a gang of young boys to work with him. He moved to the Coorong region in 1898 and became a bushranger. Riding on his ostrich, Peggotty would surprise his victims with his appearance, holding them up with a pair of small pistols. He is described as riding his ostrich bare chested and wearing a large amount of gold jewellery.

Police dismissed reports of Peggotty until the body of a man was found with large bird prints in the dirt surrounding him. He was confronted by a group of horse mounted police in 1899 while riding his ostrich, and despite the police opening fire and giving chase, Peggotty escaped. Peggotty is believed to have committed at least 12 hold-ups and one more murder.

Death and legacy
On 17 September 1899, during the commission of a hold-up near the town of Meningie, Peggotty was shot and critically wounded by his victim, Henry Carmichael.  The ostrich on which Peggotty was riding was also shot, and fled with Peggotty still mounted on it. The body of the ostrich was recovered and a trail of blood was seen travelling away from the bird, but the body of Peggotty was never found. His amassed fortune, reputedly more than a million dollars worth, which he wore on his body, was never recovered.

Some doubt the veracity of the story of Peggotty, claiming that the story has been perpetuated to boost local tourism. Meningie erected a statue of an ostrich wearing a riding saddle in commemoration of Peggotty in May 2013. The statue is of an emu painted to look like an ostrich.

References

1864 births
1899 deaths
19th-century Australian criminals
19th-century Irish criminals
Bushrangers
People from County Limerick
Australian folklore
Irish emigrants to colonial Australia
Irish expatriates in South Africa
Irish people imprisoned abroad
Prisoners and detainees of England and Wales
People convicted of burglary
Deaths by firearm in South Australia